Erika Rüegg (born 20 March 1952) is a Swiss former breaststroke swimmer. She competed in three events at the 1972 Summer Olympics.

References

External links
 

1952 births
Living people
Swiss female breaststroke swimmers
Olympic swimmers of Switzerland
Swimmers at the 1972 Summer Olympics
Place of birth missing (living people)
20th-century Swiss women